Asht District or Nohiya-i Asht is a district in the northernmost tip of Sughd Region, Tajikistan, bordering on Uzbekistan to the north, the east, and the south. Its capital is the town Shaydon. The population of the district is 168,100 (January 2020 estimate).

Administrative divisions
They are as follows:

References

Districts of Tajikistan
Sughd Region